In mathematics, particularly in matrix theory, a permutation matrix is a square binary matrix that has exactly one entry of 1 in each row and each column and 0s elsewhere. Each such matrix, say , represents a  permutation of  elements and, when used to multiply another matrix, say , results in  permuting the rows (when pre-multiplying, to form ) or columns (when post-multiplying, to form ) of the matrix .

Definition 

Given a permutation  of m elements,

represented in two-line form by 

Both methods of defining permutation matrices appear in the literature and the properties expressed in one representation can be easily converted to the other representation. This article will primarily deal with just one of these representations and the other will only be mentioned when there is a difference to be aware of.

The m × m permutation matrix P = (pij) obtained by permuting the columns of the identity matrix , that is, for each i,  if j = (i) and  otherwise, will be referred to as the column representation in this article. Since the entries in row i are all 0 except that a 1 appears in column (i), we may write

where , a standard basis vector, denotes a row vector of length m with 1 in the jth position and 0 in every other position.

For example, the permutation matrix P corresponding to the permutation  is

 
Observe that the jth column of the  identity matrix now appears as the (j)th column of P.
 
The other representation,  obtained by permuting the rows of the identity matrix , that is, for each j, pij = 1 if i = (j) and  otherwise, will be referred to as the row representation.

Properties 

The column representation of a permutation matrix is used throughout this section, except when otherwise indicated.

Multiplying  times a column vector g will permute the rows of the vector:

However, observing that 

for each  shows that the permutation of the rows is given by −1. ( is the transpose of matrix .)

As permutation matrices are orthogonal matrices (that is), the inverse matrix exists and can be written as

Multiplying a row vector h times  will permute the columns of the vector:

Notice also that

 

The same matrices acting on row vectors (that is, post-multiplication) compose according to the same rule

To be clear, the above formulas use the prefix notation for permutation composition, that is,

The properties of this representation can be determined from those of the column representation since  In particular, 

From this it follows that 

Similarly,

Permutation matrices can be characterized as the orthogonal matrices whose entries are all non-negative.

Matrix group 
If (1) denotes the identity permutation, then  is the identity matrix.

Let  denote the symmetric group, or group of permutations, on {1,2,...,}.  Since there are  permutations, there are  permutation matrices.  By the formulas above, the  permutation matrices form a group under matrix multiplication with the identity matrix as the identity element.

The map  that sends a permutation to its column representation is a faithful representation.

Doubly stochastic matrices

A permutation matrix is itself a doubly stochastic matrix, but it also plays a special role in the theory of these matrices. The Birkhoff–von Neumann theorem says that every doubly stochastic real matrix is a convex combination of permutation matrices of the same order and the permutation matrices are precisely the extreme points of the set of doubly stochastic matrices. That is, the Birkhoff polytope, the set of doubly stochastic matrices, is the convex hull of the set of permutation matrices.

Linear algebraic properties

The trace of a permutation matrix is the number of fixed points of the permutation. If the permutation has fixed points, so it can be written in cycle form as  where  has no fixed points, then  are eigenvectors of the permutation matrix.

To calculate the eigenvalues of a permutation matrix , write  as a product of cycles, say, . The union of all s is the set of eigenvalues of the corresponding permutation matrix. The geometric multiplicity of each eigenvalue equals the number of s that contain it.

From group theory we know that any permutation may be written as a product of transpositions. Therefore, any permutation matrix  factors as a product of row-interchanging elementary matrices, each having determinant −1. Thus, the determinant of a permutation matrix  is the signature of the corresponding permutation.

Examples

Permutation of rows and columns
When a matrix M is multiplied by a permutation matrix P on the left to make PM, the product is the result of permuting the rows of M.  As a special case, if M is a column vector, then PM is the result of permuting the entries of M:  

When instead M is multiplied by a permutation matrix on the right to make MP, the product is the result of permuting the columns of M.  As a special case, if M is a row vector, then MP is the result of permuting the entries of M:

Permutation of rows
The permutation matrix Pπ corresponding to the permutation  is

Given a vector g,

Explanation 
A permutation matrix will always be in the form 

where eai represents the ith basis vector (as a row) for Rj, and where

is the permutation form of the permutation matrix.

Now, in performing matrix multiplication, one essentially forms the dot product of each row of the first matrix with each column of the second. In this instance, we will be forming the dot product of each row of this matrix with the vector of elements we want to permute. That is, for example, v = (g0,...,g5)T, 
eai·v = gai

So, the product of the permutation matrix with the vector v above, will be a vector in the form (ga1, ga2, ..., gaj), and that this then is a permutation of v since we have said that the permutation form is  

So, permutation matrices do indeed permute the order of elements in vectors multiplied with them.

Restricted forms 

 Costas array, a permutation matrix in which the displacement vectors between the entries are all distinct
 n-queens puzzle, a permutation matrix in which there is at most one entry in each diagonal and antidiagonal

See also 
 Alternating sign matrix
 Exchange matrix
 Generalized permutation matrix
Rook polynomial
Permanent

References

 

Matrices
Permutations
Sparse matrices